Simon William Moore (born 19 May 1990) is an English professional footballer who plays as a goalkeeper for Championship club Coventry City. He also represented the Isle of Wight in the 2009 Island Games.

Career

Early career
Born in Sandown on the Isle of Wight, Moore started at Brading Town. He was signed by Premier League side Southampton academy. Moore said he was released by the club for being too small. He returned to Isle of Wight based side Brading Town, before signing for Farnborough.

Brentford
Moore signed with Brentford in August 2009 after spending the summer at the club on trial, but had to wait until May 2010 to make his debut, when he appeared against Hartlepool United as a substitute for regular number one goalkeeper Wojciech Szczęsny.

He was loaned out in October 2010 to Basingstoke Town and played until January 2011, in 10 games for the club.

The 2012–13 season was Moore's breakthrough season at Brentford. He started the season as an understudy to goalkeeper Richard Lee. During Lee's time out injured Moore put in some good performances and cemented his place in the Brentford team under Uwe Rösler. He helped Brentford reach the FA Cup fourth round, this included a 2–2 draw with European Champions Chelsea, and finish third in the league missing out on promotion on the final day of the season after a dramatic game with Doncaster Rovers. Brentford entered the play-offs, where they were drawn in the semi-final against Swindon Town. Brentford reached the playoff final defeating Swindon in the semi-finals on penalties (Moore saved Miles Storeys' spotkick in the shootout), but they lost the final to Yeovil Town 2–1.

Cardiff City 
On 29 July 2013, Moore was signed by Malky Mackay a four-year deal with newly promoted Premier League side Cardiff City. After failing to displace David Marshall, Moore was sent out on loan to Bristol City on 30 January 2014, not long after new manager Ole Gunnar Solskjær took charge of Cardiff. He was sent out on loan to get a regular run of games. Whilst out on loan to Bristol City, Cardiff were relegated from the Premier League.

On 30 January 2014, Moore joined Bristol City on loan for the remainder of the 2013–14 campaign. He made his debut on 1 February in a 2–1 win against Carlisle United, going on to make 11 appearances for the side.

Moore had to wait until the following season, 2014–15, to make his debut for Cardiff City in a 2–1 victory away to Coventry City in the League Cup. He made his league debut for Cardiff City keeping a clean sheet in a 1–0 victory in the Championship at home to Fulham on 10 January 2015. Towards the end of the 2014–15 season, Moore had a regular run of games for Cardiff under manager Russell Slade, including an impressive performance in a 2–1 victory against his old club Brentford.

Moore started the 2015–16, due to the suspension of David Marshall. He gifted Fulham their opening goal in a 1–1 game on the opening day but was praised the following game against Queens Park Rangers, where he put in a man of the match performance.

Sheffield United
In August 2016, Moore entered talks with League One club Sheffield United over a move, worth around £500,000. He signed a three-year contract with the club on 19 August. He was named in the PFA League One Team of the Year after leading Sheffield United to promotion.

International career
Moore played for the Isle of Wight in the 2009 Island Games.

Career statistics

Honours
Sheffield United
EFL League One: 2016–17
Individual
PFA Team of the Year: 2016–17 League One

Personal life
Moore is the brother of Blackpool goalkeeper Stuart Moore. Their father and grandfather were also goalkeepers.

References

External links

1990 births
Living people
People from Sandown
English footballers
Association football goalkeepers
Brading Town F.C. players
Farnborough F.C. players
Brentford F.C. players
Basingstoke Town F.C. players
Cardiff City F.C. players
Bristol City F.C. players
Sheffield United F.C. players
Coventry City F.C. players
English Football League players
Premier League players
National League (English football) players